This is a list of notable noodle dishes. Noodles are a type of staple food made from some type of unleavened dough which is rolled flat and cut into one of a variety of shapes. While long, thin strips may be the most common, many varieties of noodles are cut into waves, helices, tubes, strings, or shells, or folded over, or cut into other shapes. Noodles are usually cooked in boiling water, sometimes with cooking oil or salt added.  They are often pan-fried or deep-fried. Noodles are often served with an accompanying sauce or in a soup.

Noodle dishes

 Ash reshteh – a type of aush (Iranian thick soup) featuring reshteh (thin noodles) and kashk (a dairy product, made from cooked or dried yogurt), commonly made in Iran and Azerbaijan
 Beshbarmak – a dish from Central Asian cuisine, usually made from finely chopped boiled meat with noodles and often served with chyk, an onion sauce
 Chow mein sandwich – typically consists of a brown gravy-based chow mein mixture placed between halves of a hamburger-style bun, and is popular on Chinese-American restaurant menus throughout southeastern Massachusetts and parts of neighboring Rhode Island
 Fried noodles – common throughout East Asia, Southeast Asia and South Asia, many varieties, cooking styles, and ingredients exist
 Guthuk – a noodle soup in Tibetan cuisine
 Instant noodles, or instant ramen, are noodles sold in a precooked and dried block with either a flavoring powder, a packet of sauce, and/or seasoning oil; the flavoring is usually in a separate packet, although in the case of cup noodles, the flavoring is often loose in the cup
 Jajangmyeon – a Chinese-style Korean noodle dish topped with a thick sauce made of chunjang, diced pork, and vegetables; variants of the dish use seafood, or other meats
 Kesme – a type of egg noodle found in various Turkic countries, Iran and Afghanistan, also found in Turkish cuisine and is called erişte and kesme in modern standard Turkish; the word itself is a nominalisation of the verb to cut or to slice, referring to the slicing of the dough involved in preparing the noodles
 Khow suey – a noodle soup made of egg noodles and curried beef or chicken with coconut milk, served with a variety of contrasting condiments
 Kugel - a casserole in Jewish cuisine made of lokshen
 Laping – a spicy cold mung bean noodle dish in Tibetan cuisine, a street food also popular in some parts of Nepal
 Laghman – a Central Asian dish of pulled noodles, meat and vegetables
 Maggi goreng – a variation of Mamak-style mee goreng, using Maggi brand of instant noodles, prepared with hot water before stir-frying, instead of fresh yellow noodle
 Mee bandung Muar – the original and authentic version served in Muar district is still considered the best
 Meeshay – also spelt mi shay, mee shay, mee shei, is a Burmese cuisine dish of rice noodles with a meat sauce
 Mì Quảng – Vietnamese dish with rice noodles, meat, and herbs, commonly served with a broth, generally infused with turmeric
 Mie ayam – a common Indonesian dish of seasoned yellow wheat noodles topped with diced chicken meat (ayam)
 Mont di – a collective term for Burmese dishes made with thin rice noodles; the rice vermicelli is used fresh, as it ferments quickly in Myanmar's tropical climate
 Nan gyi thohk – a thoke salad dish in Burmese cuisine, made with thick round rice noodles mixed with specially prepared chicken curry and chili oil
 Noodle soup – a variety of soups with noodles and other ingredients served in a light broth, a common dish across East Asia, Southeast Asia and the Himalayan states of South Asia; various types of noodles are used, such as rice noodles, wheat noodles, and egg noodles
 Ohn no khao swè – a Burmese dish consisting of wheat noodles in a curried chicken and coconut milk broth thickened with gram flour (chickpea flour)
 Pancit – in Filipino cuisine, pancit (also spelt pansít) are noodles and the dishes made from them, typically using rice noodles
 Pancit Malabon – its sauce has a yellow-orange hue, attributable to achuete (annatto seeds), shrimp broth, and flavor seasoned with patis (fish sauce for a complex umami flavor) and crab fat
 Saimin – a noodle soup dish common in the contemporary cuisine of Hawaii
 Silesian dumplings
 Singapore-style noodles – stir-fried cooked rice vermicelli, curry powder, vegetables, scrambled eggs and meat, most commonly chicken, beef, char siu pork, or prawns, yellow in colour
 Soto ayam – a traditional Indonesian dish that uses ingredients such as chicken, lontong, noodles, and rice vermicelli
 Sukhothai – a style of rice noodle soup (kuai tiao) served in Thailand
 Thenthuk – a hand-pulled noodle soup (thukpa), a very common noodle soup in Tibetan cuisine
 Thukpa – a Tibetan noodle soup
 Yaka mein – a type of beef noodle soup found in many Creole restaurants in New Orleans; also a type of Chinese wheat noodle
 Yakisoba – a Japanese noodle stir-fry dish

Burmese

 Kat kyi kaik – a spicy Burmese fried noodle dish
 Khauk swè thoke – a wheat noodle salad made with dried shrimp, shredded cabbage, carrots, fish sauce, lime and dressed with fried peanut oil
 Kyay oh – a popular noodle soup made with pork and egg 
 Kya zan hinga – a glass noodle in chicken consommé dish
 Meeshay – rice noodles with a meat sauce
 Mohinga – rice noodle and fish soup considered by many to be the national dish of Myanmar
 Mont di – a collective term for Burmese dishes made with thin rice noodles
 Nan gyi thohk – an a thoke salad dish made with thick round rice noodles mixed with chicken curry and chili oil
 Ohn no khao swè – wheat noodles in a curried chicken and coconut milk broth thickened with chickpea flour
 Sigyet khauk swè – a fried noodle dish usually including garlic and duck
 Shan khauk swè – a "soup version" of meeshay without gel, and fish sauce instead of soy sauce, with flat or round noodles, where the soup is part of the dish itself, rather than as consommé

Bhutanese

 Bagthuk – rich potato soup with wholemeal hand-cut noodles
 Jangbuli – whole-wheat pasta served with curd and chives

Cambodian

 Banh kanh – thick noodles used in Cambodia and Vietnam
 Banh sung – thin noodles used in Cambodia and Vietnam
 Cha kuyteav – stir fry noodles with pork belly
 Kuyteav – a soup with rice noodles and pork stock with toppings
 Kuyteav kha kou – rice noodles in a beef stew or thick broth soup
 Lort cha – rice pin noodles stir-fried in fish sauce, soy sauce and palm sugar, with garlic, bean sprouts and scallions or chives
 Nem – many kinds of salads are made with this type of clear noodle
 Num banhchok – consists of rice vermicelli topped with a cool fish gravy and raw vegetables
 Num banhchok samla kari – similar, with curry
 Phnom Penh noodle soup – hot pork broth simmered with pork bone, dried shrimps, dried squids, and fresh daikon, grilled onion, and spices

Chinese

There is a great variety of Chinese noodles, which vary according to their region of production, ingredients, shape or width, and manner of preparation. They are an important part of most regional cuisines within China, as well as in Taiwan, Singapore, and other Southeast Asian nations with sizable overseas Chinese populations.

  
  
  
  
  
 
  
  
宽粉 (Kuan fen noodles)
  
  
  
 
  
  
  
  
火锅炖粉 (Huoguo dun fen)

Hong Kong

Indonesian

 
 
 
 
 
 
 
 
 
 
 
 
 
 
 
 
 
 
 Mie bancir
 
 
 
 
 
 
 
 
 
 
 
 
 
 
 
 
 
 Mie koba
 
 
 
 
 
 Mie lendir
 Mie letheg
 Mie ongklok
 
 
 Mie pentil
 
 Mie sagu
 
 
 
 
 Miedes

Japanese

Japanese noodles are a staple part of Japanese cuisine. They are often served chilled with dipping sauces, or in soups or hot dishes.

Korean

 
 
 
 
 
 
 
 
 
 
 
 
 
  (ram-don)

Kyrgyzstan
 Ashlan-fu – Karakol cold noodles.

Laotian

Malaysian

  
 
  
  
 
 
 
  
 Mee bandung - Malaysian shrimp and beef flavoured noodle soup
 Mee goreng
 
  
  
 
 Mee sotong – Malaysian noodle with squid.
 Mee udang – Malaysian prawn noodles.

Nepalese

Palestinian
 Rqaq w Adas – Palestinian noodle with lentils.

Filipino

Singaporean

Spanish

Taiwanese

Thai

 Drunken noodles
 Khao soi
 Mi krop
 Pad see ew
 Nam ngiao
 Pad thai
 Rat na

Tibetan

United States

Hawaii

Uzbek

Vietnamese

Gallery

See also

 List of fried noodle dishes
 List of noodles
 List of instant noodle brands
 List of noodle restaurants
 List of ramen dishes
 List of pasta
 List of pasta dishes

References

External links
 
 
 
 
 
 
 
 
 
 
 
 

Noodle dishes
Noodle